is a commuter railway station on the Enoshima Electric Railway (Enoden), located in the Koshigoe neighborhood of the city of Kamakura, Kanagawa Prefecture, Japan. Though small in size, it is known for its scenic beauty, as it commands an open view of the Pacific Ocean and Mount Fuji from the station platform.

Lines
Kamakurakōkōmae Station is served by the Enoshima Electric Railway Main Line and is 4.7 kilometers from the terminus of the line at Fujisawa Station.

Station layout
The station consists of a single side platform serving bi-directional traffic. The station is unattended.

Platforms

History 
It was renamed to its present name on 20 August 1953.

Station numbering was introduced to the Enoshima Electric Railway January 2014 with Kamakurakōkōmae being assigned station number EN08.

Passenger statistics
In fiscal 2019, the station was used by an average of 4,378 passengers daily, making it the 6th used of the 15 Enoden stations.

The average passenger figures for previous years (boarding passengers only) are as shown below.

Surrounding area
Shichirigahama
 Kanagawa Prefectural Kamakura High School
 Japan National Route 134
 St. Theresia Hospital

Gallery

See also
 List of railway stations in Japan

References

External links

Enoden station information 

Railway stations in Kanagawa Prefecture
Railway stations in Japan opened in 1903
Kamakura, Kanagawa